Der nayer veg was a Yiddish language weekly newspaper published from Vilna, Russia between  and . It was the central party organ of the Zionist Socialist Workers Party. It replaced the previous organ Der yidisher proletar ('The Jewish Proletarian'). The newspaper had a circulation of some 7,000 copies.

Content
Per Trachtenberg (2008) the newspaper "contained some of the first attempts to apply critical scholarly methods to the study of the Yiddish language, literature, and the material conditions of Russian Jewry in the Yiddish language, and [was, along with the Jewish Socialist organ Di folksshtime,] important precursors to the scholarly work that would appear in the post-1905 revolutionary period". The editors and writers of the respective party organs Der nayer veg and Di folksshtime argued for consolidation of Jewish cultural identity as a counter-weight to assimilation. Whilst Der nayer veg functioned as a party organ with news and reports on party activities, it also carried literary criticism authored by Shmuel Niger, scholarly economic analysis by Jacob Lestschinsky and works of fictional literature authored by I. L. Peretz, David Frischmann, Sholem Asch, Einhorn, Peretz Hirschbein, etc.. The publication carried debates between Nachman Syrkin and Litvakov over the relation between territorialism and economic factors. Another contributor was W. Bertoldi.

Der nayer veg was closed down by government authorities. In total 25 issues of Der nayer veg were published. Der nayer veg was succeeded by Dos vort ('The Word') in May 1907.

References

Jews and Judaism in Vilnius
Mass media in Vilnius
Newspapers established in 1906
Publications disestablished in 1907
Territorialism
Yiddish-language mass media in Lithuania
Yiddish socialist newspapers
Zionism in Lithuania